Urmas Sõõrumaa (born 29 November 1961) is an Estonian businessman and sports personality.

He was born in Kohila. In 2000, he graduated from Tartu University's Faculty of Law.

Since 1999, he is the chairman of the council of the company U.S. Invest.

From 2007 to 2013, he was President of Estonian Tennis Association.

Since 2016, he is President of Estonian Olympic Committee.

In 2003, he was awarded with Order of the White Star, III Class.

References

Living people
1961 births
Estonian businesspeople
Estonian people in sports
University of Tartu alumni
Recipients of the Order of the White Star, 3rd Class
People from Kohila